Anisophyllea chartacea is a tree of Borneo in the family Anisophylleaceae. The specific epithet  is from the Latin meaning "papery", referring to the leaves.

Description
The leaves are chartaceous.

Distribution and habitat
Anisophyllea chartacea is endemic to Borneo where it is confined to Sarawak. Its habitat is lowland mixed dipterocarp forest.

References

chartacea
Trees of Borneo
Endemic flora of Borneo
Flora of Sarawak
Plants described in 1993
Taxonomy articles created by Polbot
Flora of the Borneo lowland rain forests